Imeni Vorovskogo may refer to:
Imeni Vorovskogo, Azerbaijan, a village in Azerbaijan
Imeni Vorovskogo, Russia, name of several inhabited localities in Russia